Pirganj is an upazila of Rangpur District in the division of Rangpur, Bangladesh. Pirganj Upazila area 409.37 km2, located in between 25°18' and 25°31' north latitudes and in between 89°08' and 89°25' east longitudes. It is bounded by mithapukur upazila on the north, Palashbari, Ghoraghat and Nawabganj Sadar (Dinajpur) upazilas on the south, Sadullapur upazila on the east, Mithapukur, Nawabganj Sadar (Dinajpur) and Ghoraghat upazilas on the west.

Population total 345593; male 176025, female 169568; Muslim 317841, Hindu 22498, Buddhist 1869, Christian 454 and others 2931.

Administration Pirganj Thana, now an upazila, was formed in 1910.

Epigrammatic history
History of pirganj mainly focused at the period of sultans. Before the sultans' period very few history and sign was found like, destroyed place of king at Pat around 5 km away from Pirganj upazila headquarter and high land at Vimshahar at Baradargah Vendabari highway. Most probably these structures were formed at the period of Pal/Sen.

There was another ancient temple at Bakduar called "Temple of Bakdebi". Bagdebi was desired goddess of king Bhabachandra. Bagduar was an ancient and civilized Porgona under Pirganj. The temple of Bhabachandra (soon to be destroyed) is situated at Udaypur under  Bagduar Porgona. 'Palergar' is situated aside of Bagdebi's temple. This place is now known as Daneshnagar. People say that Bharatchandra/ Hobochandea, relative of 'king Lora' was live at 'Lorarpat'. Which is 06 km away from Pirganj. Most probably this area was developed at early 11th century.

Rangpur along with Pirganj was a part of Kamrup. After Baktiar Khalgi failed to capture this part of the kamrup and died (1206 AD-1210 AD) Sultan Giash Uddin tried to capture Kamrup in 1227 AD and failed. Tughrel Kha primarily captured this area but in the long run he failed to continue his control. At last Shah Ismail Gazi Captain of thirteenth Gour's Pathanian Sultan Rukunnuddin Abul Mujahid Barbak Shah was able to capture Kamrup. Shah Ismail Gazi was a Muslims religious leader, captain and Muslim missionary. The king of Ghoraghat Bhandari Roy was envious with his success and started to conspiracy against him and be able to convince Sultan Rukunnuddin Abul Mujahid Barbak Shah to send soldier against him. He was arrested and killed on 8 January 1474 AD (14th Saban, 878 Hizri) and his head was brought to king. Later Sultan Rukunnuddin Abul Mujahid Barbak Shah be able to know about the conspiracy of Bhandari Roy and became repentant. Repentant king buried the head of Shah Ismail Gazi at bagduar of pirganj with due respect. His follower's were already buried his headless body in Mandaron under Hugli district. A small island in the Barabila near Pirganj unzila headquarter is memorable for Shah Ismail Gazi. There was a mosque in this island prepared by his followers but now this mosque is fully destroyed. Mosque (30F X 20F X 15F) and the large well at Baradargah under Pirganj Upazila was one of the most memorable place for Shah Ismail Gazi. Most of the historian believes that his journey for victory and missionary was started from this place and the Introstick (Dikshadanda) is buried in this place. Some historian believes that his part of body was also buried in this place. Some historians believe that part of his body is also buried at Ghoraghat under Dinapur District.

The history of Pirganj is mostly related with the victory of Shah Ismail Gazi. At the time of his victory against King Nilambbar, Kamrup was joined with the Independent Bangla permanently. At the time of Hussain Shah Pirganj was introduced as an administrative centre and Barabila area was introduced as Land Revenue Pargana (an administrative unit). Up to Battle of Palashi these units were remain unmoved. From the British period there are some changes done within these administrative units but no remarkable change was done till today.

Geography

It is the southernmost upazila of Rangpur district. It is surrounded by Mithapukur upazila of Rangpur to the North, Sadullahpur upazila of Gaibndha to the east, Palashbari upazila to the south and Ghoraghat and Nawabganj upazilas of Dinajpur to the west. It has approximately 101640 units of household and total area 411.34 km2.

Water bodies the main river: Karatoya, Jamuneshwari, Akhira; Pirganj is called the upazila of beel.

Demographics

As of the 1991 Bangladesh census, Pirganj has a population of 303384. Males constitute 50.72% of the population, and females 49.28%. This Upazila's eighteen up population is 154333. Pirganj has an average literacy rate of 26.5% (7+ years), and the national average of 32.4% literate.

Economy

Agriculture is the predominant economic activity in Pirganj. In addition to rice, the main crop, many vegetables and bananas are produced in Pirganj. Local traders as well as traders from Dhaka, Chittagong and other parts of the country purchase the surplus agricultural products from the area and sell them to major urban centres in the country. Fishing is also a major economic activity in the area. Karotoa, a large river, which flows through the western border of the upazila is known for its variety of fish. There are numerous lakes (known as beel locally) and couple of small rivers in Pirganj.

Major commercial centers are Pirganj, Chatra, Balua, Khalashpir, Vendabari, Motherganjhat is big commercial area and Shanerhat. There are branches of Islami Bank, Standard Bank, Janata Bank, Rashahi Krishi Unnayan Bank in Pirganj, Sonali Bank in Pirganj Chatra and Khalashpir. There are also branches of Rupali Bank in Vendabari, Agrani Bank in Shanerhat and Janata Bank in Motherganj.

Natural resources

Pirganj is endowed with one of the largest coal discoveries in Bangladesh. The coal deposit is located at a low depth near Khalashpir.

Arts and culture

Several cultural organizations and theater groups based in Pirganj proper. An annual fair, known as mela locally, takes place in Baradargah in the Islamic month of Muharram. Annual fairs also take place in few other locations during winter or on the eve of Bengali new year. Sharadiya Durga puja is celebrated in Pirganj, Chatra and few other localities.

Islam is the predominant religion in Pirganj, with almost 90% of its people belonging to the faith. There is a significant Hindu population scattered over the Upazila. Concentration of Hindu population is high in Panchgachi Union. There is a large indigenous Santal population in Chatra area.

A cultural organization named Angon is located in the village Boger Bari in Kumedpur union. They arrange various seasonal programs such as cultural activities and sports competitions. A student-based social organization named Concerned Peoples Organization (CPO) is located in the village of Gurzipara in Baradargah union, which arranges social programs to concern people of its area.

Points of interest

The major tourist attractions in Pirganj are Baro Bila (a large lake), Nil Daria (a village surrounded by a lake), Kadirabad forest (a large forest created by Bangladesh Forest Department), Hatibanda (Dareapur) Mosque (an old mosque), Khalashpir Mosque, Anandonagar amusement park near Khalashpir and Raipur Jomider Bari and Horin Shingher Dighi (a big pond) and Gorr (a part of Brobila). There are remnants of the palace of King Nilambor in Patgram. The shrine of Kazi Kabi Heyat Mamud is located in Jharbishla near Vendabari.

Administration
Pirganj Upazila is divided into 15 union parishads: Bhendabari, Boro Alampur, Borodargah, Chaitrakul, Chatra, Kabilpur, Kumedpur, Madankhali, Mithapur, Pachgachi, Pirganj, Raypur, Ramnathpur, Shanerhat, and Tukuria. The union parishads are subdivided into 308 mauzas and 332 villages.

Pirganj was one of the three constituencies from where the current Bangladesh Prime Minister Sheikh Hasina was elected as an MP in the ninth parliamentary election of the country in 2008. She was also elected in the tenth parliamentary election in 2014 from the same constituency. Later in the by-election, Shirin Sharmin Chowdhury, the current speaker of Bangladesh parliament was elected unopposed from the constituency.

Transport

One can travel from Dhaka to Pirganj by bus. Rangpur-bound buses run from Kallyanpur in Dhaka to Pirganj bus station. It takes about six hours. Pirganj is about 60 kilometers towards to the north from Bogra. It is on the way from Bogra to Rangpur (the distance from Bogra to Rangpur is about 100 kilometers). The nearest airport is at Saidpur, Nilphamari. Communication from Rangpur town is very easy. It takes about 40 minutes by bus.

There have been some improvements in road communication within Pirganj Upazila in the recent years. All major commercial centers are connected by pacca roads. From Dhaperhat,
a circular route covers Chatra, Khalashpir, Vendabari, Baro Dargah, Shanerhat and Motherganj and come back to Dhaperhat.

A bridge name Wazed Mia Bridge on the river Karotoa near Kanchdah ghat in Pirganj has been opened recently. The bridge has made the communication between Rangpur and Dinajpur districts much easier.

Education

Colleges
 Pirganj College
 Government Shah Abdur Rouf College
 Chatra Degree College
 Chatra Karigori College
 Chatra Women's College
 Gurzipara College
 K J Islam girls school and college
 Kadirabad Women's College
 Khalashpir Bangobondhu Degree College
 Mohiosi Begum Rokeya Mohila College, Gurzipara
 Monikrishan Sen College, Bishnupur
 Motherganj College
 Pirganj Karigori College
 Pirganj Mohila College
 Rasulpur School & College
 Sirajuddin Technical & Business Management College
 Vendabari Women's College
 Amodpur Mahavidyalaya

High schools
 Abdullahpur Jahan Mhamud High School
 Akota Bajar High School
 Bishnupur Beni Madhab Sen High School
 Chak Karim High School
 Chander Bazer High School
 Chatra Girls High School
 Chatra High School
 Doshmouza High school
 Eklimpur High school
 Gilabari High School
 Gurzipara K.P. High School, Gurzipara
 Hazi Boyan Uddin High School
 Hitabanda KMT High School
 Jafor Para High School
 Jahangirabad High School
 Kadirabad High School
 Kanchon Bajar High School
 Khataber Para PMA High School
 Khedmotpur High School
 Kumedpur High School
 Laldighi Girls Academy
 Laldighi High School
 Laldighi mela Adhorso High School
 Maderganj High School
 Nildorea High School
 Panbazer High School
 Patnichara High School
 Pirganj Bangobandhu high School
 Pirganj Government High School
 Pirganj Kasimonnessa Girls High School
 Raipur High School
 Rasulpur High school
 Shanerhat High school
 Sheikh Hasina Adarsha Girl's High School
 Vendabari High School
 Vimshahar High School

Madrasahs
 Boro Dargah Hazrat Shah Ismail Gazi (R) Fazil Madrasha
 Chatrahat Alim Madrasah
 Dhorakandor Dakhil Madrasha,
 Duramithipur Darus Sunnat Dhakil Madrasha
 Gurzipara Dakhil Madrasha,
 Jafar Para Kamil Madrasha
 Jamtola Madinatul Ulum Madrasa
 Khalashpir Senior Fazil Madrasha
 kholahati dakhil madrasaha
 Kumedpur Madrasha
 Maderganj Fazil Madrasha
 Patnichara Girls Dakhil Madrasha
 Pirganj Senior Fazil Madrasha
 Radhakrisna pur Nezamia Dhakhil Madrasha
 shahapur madrasha
 Shaner hat Islamia Dakhil Madrasha
 Sharolia T.M Fazil Madrasha

Notable residents
 M. A. Wazed Miah, nuclear scientist and husband of Prime Minister Sheikh Hasina, was born at Fatepur village in 1942.
 Jamindar Shah Mobarak Ali, A landlord of Pirganj Upazilla. He ruled Mithipur, Ramnathpur, Shanerhaat, Jahangirabad, Panchgachi and Some portion of Pirganj Union <from Jamtala to Shanerhat> Founder Of Panbajar DM High School, Builder of Madarganj Haat, Shanerhat. Mainly he was from Western Iran during the ruling time of Subedar Sher Khan Sur. His leaving family members are now in the every sector of Bangladesh with having a many powerful places. 
 Shah Abdur Rauf, member of the Bengal Legislative Assembly, was born the village of Makimpur in 1889.

See also
 Upazilas of Bangladesh
 Districts of Bangladesh
 Divisions of Bangladesh

References

External links 
 Government website of Pirgonj Upazila
 

Upazilas of Rangpur District